Vikström is a surname of Swedish origin. Notable people with the surname include:

 John Vikström (born 1931), Archbishop emeritus of Finland
 Peter Vikström, wheelchair tennis player
 Thomas Vikström (born 1969), Swedish vocalist

See also
 Wikström

Swedish-language surnames